Mandora Station is a cattle station  on the Western Australia coast south of Broome, located in the Shire of Broome.  In earlier years it has also been a sheep station.

It maintains a weather station and is noted for the Mandora Marsh wetland, and for its proximity to Eighty Mile Beach, which are key stopping places for migratory birds.

Mandora crater on Mars is named after the locality; the name of the Mandurah suburb of Madora Bay was also derived from that of the station.

In 2017 the property was sold by Peter and Pol Edmunds. The Edmunds are relatives of the De Pledge family who had owned the property since the 1940s. The  property stocked with 4,500 head of droughtmaster cattle was bought by the Sale family who also have an interest in Bulka, Yougawalla, and Margaret River Stations.

Climate

See also
List of ranches and stations

Notes

External links
Daily weather observations for Mandora

Homesteads in Western Australia
Pastoral leases in Western Australia
Kimberley (Western Australia)